Willebrord Snellius (born Willebrord Snel van Royen) (13 June 158030 October 1626) was a Dutch astronomer and mathematician,  Snell. His name is usually associated with the law of refraction of light known as Snell's law.

The lunar crater Snellius is named after Willebrord Snellius. The Royal Netherlands Navy has named three survey ships after Snellius, including a currently-serving vessel.

Biography 
Willebrord Snellius was born in Leiden, Netherlands. In 1613 he succeeded his father, Rudolph Snel van Royen (1546–1613) as professor of mathematics at the University of Leiden.

Snellius' triangulation 

In 1615, Snellius, after the work of Eratosthenes in Ptolemaic Egypt in the 3rd century BC, probably was the first to try to do a large-scale experiment to measure the circumference of the earth using triangulation. He was helped in his measurements by two of his students, the Austrian barons Erasmus and Casparus Sterrenberg. In several cities he also received support of friends among the city leaders (regenten). In his work The terrae Ambitus vera quantitate (1617) under the author's name ("The Dutch Eratosthenes") Snellius describes the methods he used. He came up with an estimate of 28,500 Rhineland rods – in modern units 107.37 km for one degree of latitude. 360 times 107.37 then gives a circumference of the Earth of 38,653 km. The actual circumference is 40,075 kilometers, so Snellius underestimated the circumference of the earth by 3.5%.

Snellius came to his result by calculating the distances between a number of high points in the plain west and southwest of the Netherlands using triangulation. In order to carry out these measurements accurately Snellius had a large quadrant built, with which he could accurately measure angles in tenths of degrees. This quadrant can still be seen in the Museum Boerhaave in Leiden. In a network of fourteen cities a total of 53 triangulation measurements were made. In his calculations Snellius made use of a solution for what is now called the Snellius–Pothenot problem.

By necessity Snellius's high points were nearly all church spires. There were hardly any other tall buildings at that time in the west of the Netherlands. More or less ordered from north to south and/or in successive order of measuring, Snellius used a network of fourteen measure points: Alkmaar : St. Laurenskerk; Haarlem : Sint-Bavokerk; Leiden : a then new part (built in 1599) of the City walls; The Hague : Sint-Jacobskerk; Amsterdam : Oude Kerk; Utrecht : Cathedral of Utrecht; Zaltbommel : Sint-Maartenskerk; Gouda : Sint Janskerk; Oudewater : Sint-Michaelskerk; Rotterdam : Sint-Laurenskerk; Dordrecht : Grote Kerk; Willemstad : Koepelkerk; Bergen-op-Zoom : Gertrudiskerk; Breda : Grote Kerk

The actual distance between the two church spires in Alkmaar and Breda, two places nearly on the same meridian, is 116.1 kilometers. The difference in latitude between Alkmaar (52° 37' 57" N) and Breda (51° 35' 20" N) is 1.0436 degree. Assuming Snellius corrected for this he must have calculated a distance of 107.37 * 1.0436 = 112.05 kilometers between the Sint-Laurenskerk in Alkmaar and the Grote Kerk in Breda.

Mathematics and physics 
Snellius was also a distinguished mathematician, producing a new method for calculating π—the first such improvement since ancient times. He rediscovered the law of refraction in 1621.

Other works 

In addition to the Eratosthenes Batavus, he published  (1621), and Tiphys Batavus (1624). He also edited Coeli et siderum in eo errantium observationes Hassiacae (1618), containing the astronomical observations of Landgrave William IV of Hesse. A work on trigonometry (Doctrina triangulorum) authored by Snellius was published a year after his death.

Death 
Snellius died in Leiden in October 1626, at the age of 46 from an illness diagnosed as colic. His grave can be seen in the Pieterskerk, Leiden.

Honours
Snellius Glacier in Antarctica is named after Willebrord Snellius.

Works

Notes

See also
Snell–Huygens refinement

References 
 Willebrord Snellius (1580-1626): a humanist reshaping the mathematical sciences, thesis of Liesbeth de Wreede, Dissertation Utrecht 2007
 N. Haasbroek: Gemma Frisius, Tycho Brahe and Snellius and their triangulations. Delft 1968.

 Klaus Hentschel: Das Brechungsgesetz in der Fassung von Snellius. Rekonstruktion seines Entdeckungspfades und eine Übersetzung seines lateinischen Manuskriptes sowie ergänzender Dokumente. Archive for History of Exact Sciences 55,4 (2001), doi:10.1007/s004070000026.

External links 

 
  
  

17th-century Dutch mathematicians
1580 births
1626 deaths
Astronomy in the Dutch Republic
Burials at Pieterskerk, Leiden
17th-century Dutch astronomers
Geodesists
Academic staff of Leiden University
Mathematics educators